Confluaria islandica is an endoparasitic tapeworm which infects the small intestine of the horned grebe. It has only been found in Lake Mývatn, Iceland and as of 2021 remains endemic to Iceland.

References 

Endemic fauna of Iceland
Eucestoda
Parasites of birds
Animals described in 2008